Frank: The True Story that Inspired the Movie is a 2014 non-fiction book by Jon Ronson, which describes his time with musician/comedian Frank Sidebottom as a keyboardist in his band in the late 1980s, as well as the inception of the 2014 movie Frank, for which he co-wrote the script.

References

2014 non-fiction books
Books about musicians
Books by Jon Ronson
Works originally published in The Guardian
Picador (imprint) books